The 12079 / 80 Bangalore City Hubli Jan Shatabdi Express is a Superfast Express train of the Jan Shatabdi Express series belonging to Indian Railways - South Western Railway zone that runs between Bangalore City Junction and Hubli Junction in India.

It operates as train number 12079 from Bangalore City Junction to Hubli Junction and as train number 12080 in the reverse direction serving the state of Karnataka.

It is part of the Jan Shatabdi Express series launched by the former railway minister of India, Mr. Nitish Kumar in the 2002 / 03 Rail Budget.

Coaches

The 12079 / 80 Bangalore City Hubli Jan Shatabdi Express has 1 AC Chair Car, 8 2nd Class seating & 2 EOG. It does not carry a Pantry car coach..

As is customary with most train services in India, Coach Composition may be amended at the discretion of Indian Railways depending on demand.

Service

As the average speed of the train is above , as per Indian Railways rules, its fare includes a Superfast surcharge.

Routeing

The 12079 / 80 Bangalore City Hubli Jan Shatabdi Express runs from Bangalore City Junction via Yesvantpur Junction, Tumakuru, Arsikere Junction, Birur Junction, Chikjajur Junction, Davangere, Harihar Ranibennur , Haveri to Hubli Junction

Traction

As the entire route is undergoing electrification, a Krishnarajapuram based WDM 3A  or a WDP 4D  locomotive powers the train for its entire journey.

Operation

12079 Bangalore City Hubli Jan Shatabdi Express runs from Bangalore City Junction on a daily basis arriving Hubli Junction the same day .

12080 Hubli Bangalore City Jan Shatabdi Express runs from Hubli Junction on a daily basis arriving Bangalore City Junction the same day .

References 

 http://pib.nic.in/archive/railbudget/railbgt2002-03/railbgtsp1.html
 https://web.archive.org/web/20160126012037/http://www.indianrail.gov.in/jan_shatabdi.html
 http://pib.nic.in/archieve/lreleng/lyr2002/rapr2002/12042002/r120420021.html
 http://swr.indianrailways.gov.in/view_detail.jsp?lang=0&id=0,4,268&dcd=449&did=138898413502782619B9490EEA6A338731236AA7A9914.web103
 http://www.firstpost.com/topic/place/bangalore-bangalore-city-hubli-jan-shatabdi-crossing-chalukya-express-video-U20sFhqTPoA-3826-1.html
 https://web.archive.org/web/20150924042947/http://www.irfca.org/~karthik/bluelightning.html
 http://www.thehindu.com/todays-paper/tp-national/tp-karnataka/jan-shatabdi-to-bangalore-to-run-daily/article2628423.ece

External links

Transport in Hubli-Dharwad
Transport in Bangalore
Rail transport in Karnataka
Jan Shatabdi Express trains